John R. Westwood (born in Richfield, Utah) is an American politician and a Republican member of the Utah House of Representatives representing District 72 since January 1, 2013. He lives in Cedar City, UT, with his wife Mary Ellen, and their five children.

Education
Westwood attended the University of Washington and earned his BS in business and finance from Southern Utah State College (now Southern Utah University).

Political career
Westwood was elected November 6, 2012.  During 2016, he served on the Business, Economic Development and Labor Appropriations Subcommittee, Retirement and Independent Entities Appropriations Subcommittee, the House Economic Development and Workforce Services Committee, House Transportation Committee, and the House Retirement and Independent Entities Committee.

2016 Sponsored Legislation

Representative Westwood floor sponsored SB 63 Survey Monument Replacement.

Elections
2012 When incumbent Republican Representative Evan Vickers ran for Utah State Senate, Westwood was chosen from among five candidates for the June 26, 2012 Republican Primary which he won with 2,679 votes (67%); and won the November 6, 2012 General election with 10,451 votes (85.4%) against Libertarian candidate Barry Short, who had run for the seat in 2010.
2014 Westwood defeated Blake Cozzens in the Republican convention and won the November 4, 2014 General election with 5,210 votes (83.4%) against Libertarian nominee Barry Short and write-in Linda Lou Allen.

References

External links
Official page at the Utah State Legislature
John Westwood at Ballotpedia
John R. Westwood at the National Institute on Money in State Politics

Year of birth missing (living people)
Living people
Republican Party members of the Utah House of Representatives
People from Cedar City, Utah
Southern Utah University alumni
University of Washington alumni
21st-century American politicians
People from Richfield, Utah